Tommy Asinga (born 20 November 1968) is a former track and field athlete from Suriname.

Asinga trained in the United States, attending Eastern Michigan University from 1991–1994, where he won All-American honors five times.

Asinga competed at three Olympic Games, representing Suriname: in 1988 at Seoul, in 1992 at Barcelona (where he was Suriname's flag bearer in the opening ceremonies) and in 1996 in Atlanta.

Asinga won the bronze medal in the 800 metres at the 1991 Pan American Games in Havana, Cuba. That same year, he also took the silver medal 800 metres run at the 1991 NCAA Outdoor Championships. Asinga placed sixth in the 1992 NCAA Indoor Championships. In 1993, Asinga was the anchor leg on the winning 3200-meter Eastern Michigan University relay team at the NCAA Indoor Championships. Asinga also won the silver medal in the Mid-American Conference outdoor 400 metres in three consecutive years in 1992, 1993 and 1994.

After graduating from Eastern Michigan University, Asinga went to Tuskegee University's School of Veterinary Medicine, and is now a practicing veterinarian in Lusaka, Zambia. He is the husband of Zambian former sprinter Ngozi Mwanamwambwa.

References
 "Tommy Asinga," http://www.emueagles.com/News/gen/2006/1/19/2005HOF.asp?path=gen
 "Eight to be added to EMU Athletic Hall of Fame," https://archive.today/20120729231409/http://www.emich.edu/focus_emu/013106/athletichalloffame.html
 "Interview met Tommy Asinga, Friday 16 June 2006," https://web.archive.org/web/20071012052353/http://www.nospang.com/index2.php?option=com_content&do_pdf=1&id=36

1968 births
Living people
Surinamese male middle-distance runners
Olympic athletes of Suriname
Athletes (track and field) at the 1988 Summer Olympics
Athletes (track and field) at the 1991 Pan American Games
Athletes (track and field) at the 1992 Summer Olympics
Athletes (track and field) at the 1995 Pan American Games
Athletes (track and field) at the 1996 Summer Olympics
Eastern Michigan University alumni
Pan American Games bronze medalists for Suriname
Pan American Games medalists in athletics (track and field)
World Athletics Championships athletes for Suriname
Competitors at the 1991 Summer Universiade
Competitors at the 1993 Summer Universiade
Eastern Michigan Eagles men's track and field athletes
Medalists at the 1991 Pan American Games